The Ararat anomaly is a structure appearing on photographs of the snowfields near the summit of Mount Ararat, Turkey, and advanced by some Christian believers  as the remains of Noah's Ark.

Location

History of existing imagery
It was first filmed during a U.S. Air Force aerial reconnaissance mission in 1949 — the Ararat massif sits on the former Turkish/Soviet border, and was thus an area of military interest — and was accordingly given a classification of "secret"  as were subsequent photographs taken in 1956, 1973, 1976, 1990 and 1992, by aircraft and satellites.

Six frames from the 1949 footage were released under the Freedom of Information Act to Porcher Taylor, a professor at the University of Richmond in Virginia, and a scholar at the Washington-based Center for Strategic and International Studies specializing in satellite intelligence and diplomacy, in 1995.

A joint research project was later established between Insight Magazine and Space Imaging (now GeoEye), using the IKONOS satellite.  IKONOS captured the anomaly  on August 5 and September 13, 2000. GeoEye has constructed a computerized video of the imagery it captured of the anomaly. The structure appears at approximately halfway through the video. A controversial "bird's eye view" satellite image, taken by IKONOS later in 2003 for the same research project, was released to the public in 2006.
  
The Mount Ararat area also has been imaged by France's SPOT satellite in September 1989, Landsat in the 1970s and NASA's Space Shuttle in 1994, as well as military satellite images captured by the CIA's KH-9 (Keyhole 9) in 1973  and KH-11 (Keyhole 11) in 1976  and 1990–1992.

Analysis
The Defense Intelligence Agency believes the anomaly shows "linear facades in the glacial ice underlying more recently accumulated ice and snow."

See also
 Searches for Noah's Ark
 Durupınar site
 Creationism
 David Fasold
 Deluge (mythology)
 Flood geology
 Gilgamesh flood myth
 Pareidolia

References

External links
 Claim CH502.1: A 1949 USAF aerial photograph of the Western Plateau of Mount Ararat shows an elongated box-like object which could be Noah's ark
 Satellite closes in on Noah's Ark mystery, CNN
 Researcher Claims Noah's Ark Find a Big Hoax, Christian Broadcasting Network via archive.org

1949 establishments in Turkey
Geography of Turkey
Noah's Ark
Mount Ararat